Dead Horse Point State Park is a state park of Utah in the United States, featuring a dramatic overlook of the Colorado River and Canyonlands National Park.

Amenities 

The park has several overlooks, a visitor center, and picnic areas. The Kayenta Campground has 21 RV campsites with electricity and tent pads. The Wingate Campground features 4 yurts, 20 RV campsites and 11 hike-in tent-only sites. There are five additional yurts at the Moenkopi Yurt area. A coffee shop serves food and beverages.

Dead Horse Point State Park features an  hiking trail that includes loops and overlooks on the East Rim Trail and the West Rim Trail. The Intrepid Trail System contains 17 miles of single-track mountain bike trails with loops of varying levels of difficulty. Bikes are also allowed single-file on paved roads.

Hunting is not allowed in the park.

Dead Horse Point name 

According to legend, the park is so named because of its use as a natural corral by cowboys in the 19th century, where horses often died of exposure. Dead Horse Point has frequently been noted on lists of unusual place names.

Film & Television 
Against a Crooked Sky (1975)
Choke Canyon (1986)
Con Air (1997)
Joe Dirt (1999)
John Carter (2012)
MacGyver (1985)
Mission: Impossible 2 (2000)
Rio Conchos (1964)
The Comancheros (1961)
Touched by an Angel (2001)
Warlock (1959)
Westworld (2016)
Thelma & Louise (1991)

See also 
 Utah State Route 313 - Dead Horse Point Mesa Scenic Byway

References

External links

 
 

Protected areas established in 1959
Protected areas of Grand County, Utah
Protected areas of San Juan County, Utah
Protected areas on the Colorado River
State parks of Utah